Michael Stephen Hoza (born 1957 in Goldsboro, North Carolina) is an American diplomat. From 2014 to 2017 Hoza served as the United States Ambassador to Cameroon.

He received his Bachelor of Science degree from Georgetown University in 1979. After working with the Washington Post Company in Washington, D.C., for six years Hoza joined the Foreign Service.

Consular career
After joining the State Department in 1985, Hoza was first posted to the U.S. embassy in Abidjan, Côte d’Ivoire as a Regional Budget and Fiscal Officer. In 1987, he was moved to the U.S. consulate in the French West Indies, where he stayed for two years before being moved to Maputo, Mozambique to be an Administrative Officer. In 1991, Hoza was recalled to work with at the Bureau of African Affairs.

Two years later, Hoza was given a post at the U.S. embassy in Asmara, Eritrea before being made Deputy Chief of Mission at the embassy in Mbabane, Swaziland in 1997. He remained in the post for three years before taking a similar job in Kathmandu, Nepal. In 2002, Hoza was made the Human Resources Officer at the U.S. embassy in Paris, France and in 2004 he became the Management Counselor in Madrid, Spain.

He stayed in Madrid until 2007 when he moved to be the Management Counselor and Acting Deputy Chief of Mission in Nairobi, Kenya. In 2010, Hoza moved to be the Management Counselor at the U.S. Embassy in Moscow.

References

External links

 https://2009-2017.state.gov/r/pa/ei/biog/231804.htm
 https://history.state.gov/departmenthistory/people/hoza-michael-stephen

1957 births
Living people
People from Goldsboro, North Carolina
Georgetown University alumni
Ambassadors of the United States to Cameroon
United States Foreign Service personnel